Pukaqucha (Quechua puka red, colored, qucha lake, "red lake" or "colored lake", hispanicized spellings Pucacocha, Pucaccocha, also known as Laguna Colorada as translated into Spanish) is a lake in the Puno Region in southern Peru. It is situated in the Lampa Province, Lampa District, east of Lampa.

References 

Lakes of Peru
Lakes of Puno Region